Frederick George Mann  (29 June 1897 – 29 March 1982) was a British organic chemist.

Academic career
He completed his doctoral studies at Downing College, Cambridge under Sir William Pope, graduating in 1923. He continued at Downing as an assistant lecturer until 1930, when he was appointed to a lectureship at Trinity College. He spent his entire academic career at Cambridge, retiring in 1964.

Scientific contributions
Mann's research spanned a variety of topics, many at the interface between organic and inorganic chemistry, including investigations of aliphatic polyamines, phosphines, arsines and their complexes; heterocyclic compounds of phosphorus and arsenic and their metal complexes; polycyclic nitrogen compounds; the structure and optical properties of transition metal complexes; stereochemistry, and cyanine dyes.

Honours and awards
He won the Royal Society of Chemistry's Tilden Prize in 1943, and was elected to the Royal Society in 1947.

References

1982 deaths
20th-century British chemists
Academics of the University of Cambridge
Fellows of the Royal Society
1897 births
Alumni of Downing College, Cambridge